Ideopsis is a genus of nymphalid butterflies in the subfamily Danainae found in South-east Asia.

Species
Listed alphabetically:
Ideopsis gaura (Horsfield, [1829]) – smaller wood nymph
Ideopsis hewitsonii Kirsch, 1877 – Hewitson's small tree-nymph
Ideopsis klassika Martin, 1909 – Seram small tree-nymph
Ideopsis juventa (Cramer, [1777]) – wood nymph, gray or grey glassy tiger
Ideopsis oberthurii (Doherty, 1891)
Ideopsis similis (Linnaeus, 1758) – Ceylon blue glassy tiger
Ideopsis vitrea (Blanchard, 1853) – Blanchard's wood nymph
Ideopsis vulgaris (Butler, 1874) – blue glassy tiger

References

 
Danaini
Nymphalidae genera
Taxa named by Thomas Horsfield